Lee Center is a hamlet located in  the Town of Lee in Oneida County, New York. It is located northwest of Rome, New York

References

Hamlets in Oneida County, New York
Hamlets in New York (state)